The canton of Rumilly is an administrative division of the Haute-Savoie department, southeastern France. Its borders were modified at the French canton reorganisation which came into effect in March 2015. Its seat is in Rumilly.

It consists of the following communes:

Alby-sur-Chéran
Allèves
Bloye
Boussy
Chainaz-les-Frasses
Chapeiry
Crempigny-Bonneguête
Cusy
Étercy
Gruffy
Hauteville-sur-Fier
Héry-sur-Alby
Lornay
Marcellaz-Albanais
Marigny-Saint-Marcel
Massingy
Moye
Mûres
Rumilly
Saint-Eusèbe
Saint-Félix
Saint-Sylvestre
Sales
Thusy
Vallières-sur-Fier
Vaulx
Versonnex
Viuz-la-Chiésaz

References

Cantons of Haute-Savoie